Gąsawka is a river of Poland, a tributary of the Noteć near Rynarzewo.

Rivers of Poland
Rivers of Kuyavian-Pomeranian Voivodeship